Sir Nevile Lubbock  (31 March 1839 – 12 September 1914) was President of the West India Committee and an English amateur cricketer.

Lubbock was born on 31 March 1839 in Pimlico, the third son of Sir John Lubbock and his wife Lady Harriet. He was educated at Eton College from the age of nine, leaving Eton when he was 15 to join his father's business in the City of London. In 1862 he joined the firm of Cavan Brothers and Company who were West India merchants, it started a lifetime of connection to the West Indies. He was a pioneer in the introduction of sugar cane-farming in Trinidad and in 1887 he was invited by the British Government to attend the first Colonial Conference. He was knighted in 1889 and became President of the West India Committee, a role he fulfilled from 1909 until 1914. He was a governor of the Royal Exchange Assurance Company and a company director.

Despite leaving Eton too young to have played in the cricket team, Lubbock played six first-class cricket matches between 1858 and 1860. He made his first-class debut in July 1858, playing for Gentlemen of Kent against Gentlemen of England at Lord's. As well as four appearances for Gentlemen of Kent, Lubbock played twice for Kent County Cricket Club in 1860. He played in non-first-class for Eton Ramblers and Gentlemen of West Kent and was described in his Wisden obituary as "a good steady batsman". Most of his brothers also played cricket, often for Gentlemen of West Kent, with two, Edgar and Alfred, also playing for Kent. His oldest brother, John, became the first Baron Avebury in 1900.

Lubbock was married twice, first to Charlotte Wood with whom he had seven sons and three daughters. After her death in 1878 he married Constance Hershel in 1880, having another son and six daughters. He died suddenly on 12 September 1914 at his home Oakley Park at Bromley Common in Kent. He was aged 75.

References

External links

1839 births
1914 deaths
English cricketers
Kent cricketers
Knights Commander of the Order of St Michael and St George
Neville
People educated at Eton College
Gentlemen of Kent cricketers
Younger sons of baronets